Geoffrey O'Grady (1 January 1928 -29 December 2008) was a professor Emeritus of linguistics whose primary field of specialisation was Australian Aboriginal languages.

Life and career

From 1952, he carried out linguistic studies, focusing particularly on the Nyangumarta language and people. Challenging the received notion that Aboriginal languages were lexically impoverished, O'Grady gathered some 4,000 roots which, together with Helmut Petri and Gisela Odermann's list of 6,550 words compiled at Anna Plains, gave proof of a rich language that could appropriate by assimilation and grammatical modification many concepts that were exclusive to the domain of Western civilisation.

Over two months in March/April 1961, O'Grady and the visiting American linguist Ken Hale made a sweeping survey tour of coastal languages spoken from Port Augusta in South Australia to Broome in Western Australia, and managed to record significant quantities of material from 26 languages.

Selected publications

Notes

Citations

Sources

1928 births
2008 deaths
Linguists from Australia
20th-century linguists
Australian stockmen